Irmela is a German feminine given name:

Famous people named Irmela
Irmela Broniecki, German fencer
Irmela Hijiya-Kirschnereit, German Japanologist and translator
Irmela Mensah-Schramm (born 1945), German human rights activist

See also
1178 Irmela, asteroid

Feminine given names